Clare Devine (also Cunningham) is a fictional character from the British Channel 4 soap opera Hollyoaks, played by actresses Gemma Bissix and Samantha Rowley. Bissix reprised the role in 2009 for the culmination of Warren Fox (Jamie Lomas) and Justin Burton's (Chris Fountain) storylines. She later returned to the show in 2013. Clare was killed-off in October 2013, and Bissix said that it would allow Hollyoaks to develop other villainous characters. Bissix has won three British Soap Awards for her portrayal of Clare, and has been named one of the best British soap opera characters.

Storylines

2005–2007
Clare first appears in December 2005 when Max Cunningham (Matt Littler) and Sam "O.B." O'Brien (Darren Jeffries) hire her as an events supervisor at The Loft. With her friendly face and likeable and vibrant personality, Clare quickly settles into life in the village and becomes popular with the other residents. Both O.B. and Max immediately fall for her, but after weeks of playing both admirers off against each other, she eventually chooses Max. Initially Max and Clare's relationship goes well, and Max soon asks Clare to move in with him. Max and Clare try to keep their relationship a secret from O.B, but after moving in, O.B. finds out but agrees to keep peace. Clare becomes friends with Mandy Hutchinson (Sarah Jayne Dunn) and Louise Summers (Roxanne McKee), and participates in a time-share scam set up by Louise's ex-husband Sean Kennedy (Matthew Jay Lewis) while on a holiday in late night special Hollyoaks: Back from the Dead. Sean begins flirting with Clare, who remains loyal to Max.

With Gemma Bissix taking over the role, a disturbing side of the character is revealed in April 2006 when Max takes his brother Tom (Ellis Hollins) on holiday. Despite turning his advances down months earlier, Clare seduces Sean after discovering his wealth. Mel Burton  (Cassie Powney) catches Clare and Sean together. Clare used Mel's alcoholism against her when she attempts to expose the affair. This causes friction between Max and O.B.. Clare schemes to get rid of O.B. and acts the loyal girlfriend to Max, who eventually proposes to her. After Tom overhears a conversation between Sean and Clare about their affair, she tries to turn Max against Tom. Max asks O.B. to be his best man, shocking Clare. On Max's stag night, O.B. discovers that Clare is planning to leave with his money. Clare plants drugs in O.B.'s pocket and gets him arrested. After being released, O.B. storms Max and Clare's wedding, telling him of her plan. Max refuses to believe this and punches him. Max decides he wants a child. Clare tells Max she was sexually abused as a child and is infertile, leaving him heartbroken. Clare convinces Max to give her £50,000, which she plans to use to flee Hollyoaks. During this time, Clare has sex with Warren Fox (Jamie Lomas). Mel and Sophie Burton (Connie Powney) find the CCTV DVD and show O.B.. The three then meet with her in The Dog and tell her to leave Max or they will show him the DVD. Clare leaves in a hurry, failing to recognise wanted fugitive Sam Owen outside. Clare returns home and begins to pack her bags. Max returns claiming The Dog is on fire, due to Sam. Clare then unpacks her belongings. After Mel and Sophie's deaths in the fire, Clare visits an injured O.B. in hospital and finds the CCTV DVD. She then disposes of it.

Max catches Warren and Clare snorting cocaine while working at The Loft. Clare convinces him it was due to her repressed memories of her sexual abuse. Max, to impress her, takes some cocaine, which leads to a heart attack. While he is in hospital, Clare finds out about Max's life insurance policy of £500,000. Clare then decides to kill Max and flee the country with his money. When he returns home, Clare begins secluding Max from his friends and tampers with his medication. Clare takes Tom and Max away for a Christmas holiday near an icy lake. Max becomes more ill due to the pills and becomes suspicious of Clare, he then discovers the tampered pills. After realising Max knew about tampering with the pills, Clare throws Tom's jacket in the lake, with Max jumping in after him. Tom runs out of the woods, revealing Clare is trying to kill Max. O.B. turns up, punches Clare and saves Max. After being questioned, Clare is released by police. Max, seeing Clare's true colours, apologises to O.B. as Clare leaves.

Clare returns to the village in January 2007. She picks Tom up from his school without telling Max, who is frantic with worry. Max and O.B. find Clare with Tom. Clare promises to make Max's life hell and makes a reference to his dead father Gordon. Max tries to strangle Clare before leaving with Tom. They return to find Clare plans to sell the flat and The Loft. Clare starts hitting herself and calls the police claiming Max has hit her. Max, O.B. and Tony Hutchinson (Nick Pickard) physically remove Clare from the flat and throw her outside, just as the police return and arrest Max for assault. Tony and O.B.'s evidence mean that Max is released without charge. Max then signs The Loft over to Clare and reclaims his house. With The Loft being run by Warren, Clare becomes his rival. Warren hires Justin Burton (Chris Fountain), who Clare seduces in an attempt to get on her side. Clare informs Warren that his sister Katy (Hannah Tointon) is in a relationship with Justin, this leads to Warren being arrested for beating him up. Clare then has Warren arrested for Sean's murder after receiving information from Justin.

Clare convinces Louise to have her unborn child aborted and tell fiancé Calvin Valentine (Ricky Whittle) it was a miscarriage. Clare later tells him the truth causing them to split up. Louise and Calvin on separate occasions attack Clare. Clare phones the social services, and tells them her false suspicions that Tom is getting physically abused by Max and O.B.. Clare then manipulates Tom into thinking he caused the deaths of his parents and baby Grace Hutchinson and would cause Max's death, this frightening Tom, he refuses to see Max, making his social worker believe he is being abused. O.B. confronts Clare about Social Services. Clare taunts him over the death of his girlfriend Mel and her sister Sophie, saying it was "two for the price of one". O.B. threatens Clare and is seen by several people in The Loft. That night, Clare goes onto The Loft balcony to investigate a noise, there, she is pushed by a mystery person. Jacqui (Claire Cooper), Carmel (Gemma Merna) and Tina McQueen (Leah Hackett) then find Clare, and beside her, Calvin's mobile.

Clare falls into a coma as the police question several people over her attack. Warren becomes the prime suspect and is charged. When she returns home, Max breaks in to Clare's flat and threatens to kill her if she does not tell the social services she lied about Tom's abuse, which she does. During Warren's trial, he appears to be getting sent down, however Mercedes McQueen (Jennifer Metcalfe) arrives and admits to sleeping with him on the night Clare was pushed. Warren is then released, where he begins pressuring Clare to sell him The Loft. Warren pushes her against the balcony she was pushed over and threatens her, she then sells Warren The Loft. As she prepares to leave Hollyoaks for good, Clare is seen off by Justin, Warren, Louise, Max, OB, Katy and Calvin. Justin grabs Clare at last minute and tells her it was him who pushed her. Clare leaves and plots revenge.

Katy is mysteriously kidnapped and Warren, Max and Justin set out to find her. After receiving several clues from Clare to Katy's whereabouts, the three head off to the docklands where Clare tells Warren to kill Justin, reminding him that Justin was the reason he was sent to jail. Warren and Max take Justin's supposedly dead body, however Clare realises he is not dead and drives off with Katy. Warren, Justin and Max set off after her. Clare skids to avoid bikers and plummets over a quarry into water below. Katy is saved, however Max is too late to save Clare, who apparently dies.

Two days after her presumed death, Clare is revealed to have survived as she arrives in a first class departures lounge in an airport. She meets a wealthy businessman named Miles, who she starts chatting to seductively. Clare introduces herself as "Clare Devine" before staring at the camera for a brief moment, breaking the fourth wall. Her destination is not revealed.

2009 Return

In May 2009, the Hollyoaks villagers awake to find the village covered in posters labelling Warren as a killer and stating that Jake Dean (Kevin Sacre) was innocent over being jailed for Sean's murder. In the coming weeks, Warren receives poison pen letters, telling him that "his days are numbered" and mysterious phone calls. In The Loft, Warren is knocked unconscious with a baseball bat and tied up. His blindfold is removed and Clare reveals herself.

Clare informs Warren that she has returned for revenge on him and Justin for ruining her life and also to get Warren's money. Clare pours petrol and gets Warren to phone Justin to come to The Loft. Warren phones his foster brother Spencer Gray (Darren John Langford) and leaves a message of Clare talking. 
Calvin turns up at The Loft and finds Warren and Clare. He phones the police, but after hearing Warren mock Clare and recalling everything Warren had put him and his family through, he hangs up and leaves. Hannah Ashworth (Emma Rigby) appears at The Loft looking for her boyfriend Justin. She is knocked unconscious by Clare, who assumes she is Justin. Clare lights a match and puts near Warren's face, but Hannah regains consciousness and attacks Clare. 
Clare drops the match, setting The Loft ablaze. Clare and Hannah then crash through the banister to the floor below, falling unconscious. 
Justin arrives. He leaves Warren sitting tied up and rescues Hannah, who he presumes is dead. Clare, meanwhile, is nowhere to be seen, barring her infamous red stiletto. Warren manages to free himself and jumps down the stairwell, landing on his ankle, which breaks. 
The fire then causes a large mirror above to snap and fall down on him, which appears to kill him instantly.

The next week, Justin is wanted for supposedly starting the fire. Spencer goes back to his and Warren's flat above Evissa, where Clare is lying in wait. 
Clare appears wanting to know where Warren's money is. Sasha Valentine (Nathalie Emmanuel) appears outside and calls the police. Sasha enters the flat and punches Clare to the floor, Clare comes round and grabs one of Warren's dumbbells to attack Sasha with, Calvin the wrestles Clare against the wall and arrests her. Clare initially tries to bribe Calvin, but CID turn up behind him and Clare is dragged off kicking and screaming aggressively.

Clare is not seen again for almost four years.

2013 Reintroduction

Clare returned to Hollyoaks village shortly after Doctor Browning's return, where he reveals to Myra McQueen (Nicole Barber-Lane) that Mercedes has gone missing in Las Vegas. 
Clare, going under the alias of "Cassandra Knight", tracks down Doctor Browning at his apartment and pretends to be just as shocked as Doctor Browning when he opens a letter addressed to him demanding "£100,000 or Mercedes dies". 
She informed Doctor Browning that she saw Mercedes getting into a limo with another man in Vegas in a bid to seduce him, to which he declines. Doctor Browning then correctly suspects Clare knew something about Mercedes’ disappearance, however he soon discards this theory as he then suspects Mercedes probably wrote the letter herself. 
Clare later returns to her hotel room where Mercedes is tied to a chair. Clare tells Mercedes that Doctor Browning suspects she wrote the ransom note, and that they need to work harder to get ransom money out of him before punching her in the face.

Clare soon persuades Doctor Browning to buy Chez Chez so that they can be business partners. He initially agrees based on their camaraderie in Vegas, but he then discovers from Jim that "Cassandra Knight" does not exist. 
When he confronts her about this, she reveals that her real name is Clare Devine and that she gets by conning rich men, failing to tell him about her history in the village. She then says that she is not conning him, because if she was, she would have finished with him already. He then decides to buy Chez Chez. However, before they both sign the ownership papers, Clare accidentally shows her hatred for Mercedes. Realising she must have known Mercedes prior to their meeting in Las Vegas, Doctor Browning rips up the papers and once again confronts Clare, who attacks Doctor Browning and flees. She is then seen returning to her hotel room, where Mercedes is seen relaxing and their conversation shows that she is apparently helping Clare with the scam. They concoct a plan to extort money from Doctor Browning. Clare helps Mercedes fake her disappearance and blackmail him for ransom money. When Mercedes realises that Clare has been lying she decides to stop the scheme. Clare knocks Mercedes unconscious taking her hostage for real, moving her to a derelict cellar. 
Clare contacts Browning and tells him to place bag of ransom money in the gym locker, to which he does, but the bag containing the money is accidentally taken by Leanne Holiday (Jessica Forrest) rendering Clare furious in believing she has been double crossed.

Clare then locks Mercedes in a metal cage located in an abandoned industrial yard, surrounded by two rabid dogs. She then lures Doctor Browning to the industrial yard under the premise of taking him to where Mercedes is being kept, but as he locks eyes on the caged Mercedes, she knocks Browning out from behind with a rock, and places him in the cage alongside Mercedes. 
Clare presses them for knowledge of where the ransom money is, and a bleeding and injured Browning tell her he suspects Tom Cunningham has the money. Clare eventually gives Mercedes the key to get out of the cage but as she and Browning attempt freedom, Claire's two rabid dogs rush towards them, barking angrily, so the twosome have to lock themselves back in again.

Clare eventually gives Mercedes the key to get out of the cage but as she and Doctor Browning attempt freedom, the two dogs rush back towards them angrily barking so the twosome have to lock themselves back in again. They have a heart to heart until he falls unconscious from the head wound but the ambulance soon arrive and just in time as Mercedes and Myra have a tearful reunion. Clare sneaks into The Dog without being noticed. She creeps up behind Tom and he is terrified as he once again comes face to face with Clare. 
Clare makes Tom lock them both in his room. Clare angrily accuses Tom of having her ransom money which he denies and offers his piggy bank money and tries to tell her there is money in the kitchen and the till. Clare gets angry at this and brings up Max's name, reminding Tom that he remembers how angry she got with Max. When Jack Osborne (Jimmy McKenna) knocks at the door, Clare makes Tom get rid of him. 
A while later, loud music comes from Tom's room and Jack and Darren Osborne (Ashley Taylor Dawson) rush to Tom's door trying to open it and upon realising that it is locked and Tom is in danger, Darren breaks the door down in to see Clare holding Tom down with a golf club. Clare forces her way past Darren and Jack and runs through the pub with Darren giving chase and falling over a stool. He manages to catch Clare and pins her to the ground until the police come and arrest Clare once again and tells the Osborne's it's not over and that she knows Tom has her money. Clare is then arrested.

A few months later, newly arrived village crime lord Fraser Black (Jesse Birdsall) and Jim McGinn (Dan Tetsell) visit Clare in prison, Fraser asks Jim to help secure her release, as it is revealed that Fraser is Clare's father. 
She tells him never to return and she will not forgive him. However Clare cannot cope with prison life and eventually accepts help. 
When she is released Fraser hands over The Loft to Clare, knowing she held a sharehold of the club in prior years.

She reveals during a conversation with Fraser's hitman Trevor Royle(Greg Wood) that she was pregnant with his baby many years prior and Fraser pushed her down the stairs, causing her to miscarry. 
 Clare wants revenge on Mercedes for putting her in jail months prior and also her father for her misguided past, so she decides to plant a bomb in The Loft. 
She enlists the help of Trevor, telling him Fraser would likely kill him to this day if he realised Trevor got Clare pregnant at a young age. 
Clare then invites Mercedes to have her 30th birthday party in The Loft, with the promise of a free venue fee. 
Trevor meanwhile has an argument with Fraser and meets Clare in The Dog, where he angrily agrees to take part in the bombing. 
The McQueens are enjoying themselves in the Loft when Clare chooses her moment to detonate the bomb, but Trevor gets cold feet when he realises there are people in the loft. As Clare goes to press the ‘call’ button to trigger the bomb, Trevor wrestles her to the ground and the detonator becomes loose. Clare gets to the phone first and presses the ‘call’ button, and instead, a block of council flats blow up after Sinead O'Connor (Stephanie Davis) took the bag containing the bomb to a party by mistake, killing Leanne, Ash Kane (Holly Weston), Doug Carter (PJ Brennan). 
Unperturbed by the detonation elsewhere, Clare goes into the Loft and lies to an oblivious Mercedes, telling her the bomb is in the Loft and threatens to kill the Mcqueens unless she follows her.
When outside, Mercedes confronts Clare, telling her she belongs in prison, Claire responds viciously, where she states she would only like to be locked up for Mercedes’ murder. Claire and Mercedes begin fighting, and Mercedes manages to push her her into the middle of the street, where she is then mowed down by an oncoming car.
The car door opens and Doctor Browning is revealed to be the driver, who gets out and retorts to Mercedes’ that ‘he wasn’t going to miss her birthday’. 
Browning is later killed in the same night by Mercedes’.

A funeral is held for Clare in the coming days. Clare's funeral features the arrival of her sister Grace Black.

Creation

Casting
The character was first introduced to Hollyoaks in December 2005, by series producer David Hanson portrayed by Samantha Rowley. The character was introduced as an events manager for The Loft nightclub, and as the story progressed, the new girlfriend of Max Cunningham, and appeared initially from 2005 to 2006, when new series producer Bryan Kirkwood decided to recast the role to Gemma Bissix after wanting to take the character in a new direction. Speaking on the Hollyoaks Podcast in 2020: Bixsix recalled "[Samantha] came from a model show of some kind, and that's when Hollyoaks were criticised for bringing people in that were models and weren't acting. That's when Hollyoaks was downgraded and it was all about what you look like. "When Bryan came in, he took it upon himself – it was literally like Pippa from Home and Away. She went upstairs with Max one night, then the next morning, I came down. I think they liked the press of it – it was an impact." Bissix had previously auditioned for five other roles on the show, and was reluctant to audition for the role of Clare.

Bissix remained in the role from 2006 to 2007, when the character left the show. It was announced in March 2009 that Clare would return for a short stint in May 2009 reintroduced by Bryan Kirkwood. The return was dubbed "stunt week", as the character got her revenge on Justin Burton and Warren Fox.

In August 2009, Bissix announced she would like to return to Hollyoaks as Clare Devine, commenting on the role she said, "You really can't get much better than playing a psychotic murderer turning up in her ripped tights and pouring petrol over everything."

Personality
When Clare originally arrived in 2005 played by Samantha Rowley, she was rather likeable and friendly. However, after the character's recast to Gemma Bissix the following year, the character revealed a dark side and this was quickly revealed around Hollyoaks. Clare became a con-woman, marrying Max Cunningham simply for his money. Clare made several attempts to kill Max, however was unsuccessful. In 2007, Clare was pushed over the balcony at The Loft. This attempt on her life led to her departure from the series, in which, her enemies assumed she had died. Almost two years later, Clare returned for her revenge on Warren Fox and Justin Burton, where she was arrested for Warren's murder.

Development

Return
On 17 March 2009. Kris Green from Digital Spy revealed that Clare could be returning to the show to coincide with Warren Fox (Jamie Lomas) and Justin Burton's (Chris Fountain) exit storylines. The return was soon confirmed. Series producer Bryan Kirkwood telephoned Bissix in December 2008 with the return offer. The succeeding producer Lucy Allan told Kris Green from Digital Spy that Clare was "pivotal in the culmination" of Justin and Warren's departure stories. She added that it would have been a "disservice" to the show not to feature her. It was revealed that Clare would return seeking revenge and traps Warren and Justin in a fire at The Loft nightclub. Clare returns in an unhinged state of mind. Bissix told the Press Association that "she's come back slightly unhinged and there isn't much that gets in her way and that's what I think is so exciting."

Reintroduction
In February 2013, it was announced that Bissix had agreed to return to Hollyoaks. Bissix had previously expressed her desire to return in August 2009. The return scenes were scheduled to broadcast in March that year. Bissix expressed excitement to work with Kirkwood again. It was announced that Clare's arrival would cause problems for Mercedes McQueen (Jennifer Metcalfe) and Doctor Browning (Joseph Thompson). While appearing on chat show The Wright Stuff Bissix hyped Clare's behaviour on her return as "extra evil". She told the Press Association that old viewers pledged to watch the show again upon Clare's reemergence. Bissix added that the drama Clare creates defines the soap opera genre. Clare was only written back into the series for the short storyline as Bissix had other work commitments. The actress later announced that she intended to rejoin the regular cast.

Departure (2013)
Bissix told a Birmingham Mail reporter that she would resume filming in July with her return airing in September. She said her return storyline was a "top secret" and that "just when I think she can’t get any worse, she does." Clare returned on-screen during the show's "first look" episode on 26 September 2013 and was being held in prison. Producers decided to keep details of her reappearance a secret until transmission. Fraser Black (Jesse Birdsall) being revealed as her father was another secret aspect of the storyline. However Clare was killed off in another "shock" storyline twist, which sees Doctor Browning run her over with his car following Clare's bomb attempt on The Loft. Bissix described Clare as the best character she had played in her career and thanked her supportive fans. She explained that Clare's departure would ultimately allow other villains to become embroiled in main storylines.

Reception

For her portrayal of Clare, Bissix was won "Villain of the Year" at the 2007 British Soap Awards. She was also nominated for "Best Actress". The following year she won "Best Exit" and "Spectacular Scene Of The Year" for her departure storyline. Her returns to the series in 2013, made Hollyoaks first winning Best Soap.

Industry experts selected named Clare one of the "top 100 British soap characters" in a What's on TV poll.

Bissix also played Clare Bates in rival soap-opera EastEnders. The characters shared similarities and a writer from The Herald suggested that Bissix actually played an identical role between the two shows. Bissix has acknowledged the comparisons but noted that Clare Devine lacks emotion, kills people and taunts little children. Bissix has also claimed that men are scared of her because of the "super bitch" role.

Clare was featured on a list of "bunny boilers" compiled in the Radio Times. A writer described her as "Devine by name, devilish by nature, Clare married Max for his money and then repeatedly tried to kill him for it. She made enemies easily, notably Warren and Justin, and when she was pushed over a balcony and almost killed, the list of suspects was longer than the electoral roll." Digital Spy's Green wrote of his disappointment of Clare's 2009 return. He branded Clare as a "fabulous character" deserving more than being "a mere plot device" in other character's departures. However, 53 per cent of readers were pleased with the return.

Clare was placed at number 7 in a Virgin Media feature about "soap's greatest comebacks". A writer for the site quipped "After seemingly falling to her death twice, it seems nothing can keep this Hollyoaks bad girl down. Clare last resurfaced, in barking mad fashion, to kill off arch-enemy Warren Fox. Now she's banged up, but we don't imagine we've seen the last of her just yet..."
Clare was also ranked at Number 7 in Digital Spy's feature on soap recasts.

From Bissix’ time in the serial, her portrayal of Clare placed the character in a minority group of the most memorable villains in the shows history. Bissix introduced a totally different element for Hollyoaks’ super bitches, being arguably the first of her kind to reach such popularity and acclaim.

References

External links
  on the E4 website

Hollyoaks characters
Fictional con artists
Fictional socialites
Fictional female businesspeople
Television characters introduced in 2005
Cunningham family
Fictional kidnappers
Fictional gangsters
Fictional criminals in soap operas
Fictional prisoners and detainees
Female characters in television
Female villains
Fictional characters incorrectly presumed dead